Meadowdale, West Virginia may refer to the following communities in West Virginia:
Meadowdale, Jackson County, West Virginia
Meadowdale, Marion County, West Virginia